The Cornelius Hennessy Building is a historic commercial building located at 1023 Chestnut St. in Murphysboro, Illinois. The building was constructed in 1896 for merchant Cornelius Hennessy, who operated a grocery store in the building. The two-story Richardsonian Romanesque building uses rough cut, locally quarried sandstone for its front facade; the remainder of the building was built with brick. A square parapet wall tops the building; the wall features four pinnacles and "1896" engraved in the middle. The first floor of the building has a cast iron storefront made by the local J. W. Lewis Foundry and Machine Shop.

The building was added to the National Register of Historic Places on November 8, 2000.

References

Commercial buildings on the National Register of Historic Places in Illinois
Romanesque Revival architecture in Illinois
Commercial buildings completed in 1896
Buildings and structures in Jackson County, Illinois
National Register of Historic Places in Jackson County, Illinois